Rianne Sigmond (born 2 May 1984) is a Dutch rower. She competed in the women's lightweight double sculls event at the 2012 Summer Olympics.

References

External links
 

1984 births
Living people
Dutch female rowers
Olympic rowers of the Netherlands
Rowers at the 2012 Summer Olympics
Sportspeople from Schiedam